David Torres may refer to:

David Torres (footballer, born 1986), Spanish football forward
David Torres (footballer, born 2003), Spanish football defender